Gallieniellidae is a family of spiders first described by J. Millot in 1947. It was originally thought to be endemic to Madagascar until species were also found in southern Kenya, northeastern Argentina, and Australia. Drassodella was transferred from the family Gnaphosidae in 1990. They are suspected to be specialized in ant-preying.

Genera

, the World Spider Catalog accepts the following genera:

Austrachelas Lawrence, 1938 — South Africa
Drassodella Hewitt, 1916 — South Africa
Galianoella Goloboff, 2000 — Argentina
Gallieniella Millot, 1947 — Madagascar, Comoros
Legendrena Platnick, 1984 — Madagascar
Meedo Main, 1987 — Australia
Neato Platnick, 2002 — Australia
Oreo Platnick, 2002 — Australia
Peeto Platnick, 2002 — Australia
Questo Platnick, 2002 — Australia

See also
 List of Gallieniellidae species

References

 

 
Araneomorphae families